Windows DreamScene is a utility that allows videos and .gif and other optimized animations to be used as desktop wallpapers. It is one of the Windows Ultimate Extras for Windows Vista. Prior to its official announcement, DreamScene was rumored to be in creation under the names Motion Desktop and Borealis. After several months of testing, the final version was released on September 25, 2007.

Rendered content included with DreamScene (such as an animated realization of the Windows Aurora background) was produced by Stardock, while photographic content was provided by the Discovery Channel. Third-party video content in MPEG or WMV format may also be used. In addition, AVI files can be played by altering the file extension. Additionally, in partnership with Dell, Microsoft released a separate DreamScene alongside its Product Red version of the Ultimate edition of Windows Vista.

One of the purported advantages of DreamScene over previous methods of desktop animation is that it makes use of the GPU for display instead of the CPU, leaving the latter free to perform user tasks. To what extent this is achieved is not specified. When a full-screen program is run, such as a game or any window that is maximized, the video will automatically stop since the video will not be seen; this means it uses less GPU and CPU. The video can also be stopped manually. Content encoders need to strive for a balance between compression and file size; decompression requires the CPU, but larger files take up more memory and may cause the disk to be accessed more frequently.

Running a video in the background would have a significant impact on the battery life of mobile computers, whether or not it were rendered by the GPU, so DreamScene may display a static background when a computer is running on batteries. The software relies heavily on the Desktop Window Manager (or DWM, part of Windows Aero).

Stardock offers a chargeable add-on for Windows DreamScene, called DeskScapes. This software allows the implementation of dynamic wallpapers (".dream" files). They have released a new version (3.5), which makes the program compatible with non-Ultimate editions of Vista and newer versions of Windows (7, 8, 10, 11).

In Windows 7, DreamScene was replaced by a "Desktop Slideshow" feature which produces slideshow background wallpapers, but does not support videos. However, it can still be enabled via third-party tools.

See also
Features new to Windows Vista
Windows Vista Ultimate Extras
List of features removed in Windows 7
 Active Desktop

References

External links 
 About Windows DreamScene
 Activate DreamScene In All Editions Of Windows 7 & Vista Without Desktop Text Bug

DreamScene
Windows Ultimate Extras

sv:Windows Vista#Nyheter